The 2010 Adelaide Sevens, promoted as the International Rugby Sevens Adelaide 2010, was a rugby sevens tournament that was part of the IRB Sevens World Series in the 2009–10 season. It was the Australian Sevens leg of the series, held between 19 and 21 March at the Adelaide Oval in South Australia.

Samoa picked up their second consecutive Cup win, following on from their victory in the USA Sevens. In a major surprise, their opponent in the final was the United States, who advanced to their first-ever Cup final. Samoa's 38–10 win enabled them to narrow the gap behind series leaders New Zealand to only 2 points.

New Zealand, who were knocked out of the Cup competition by Samoa, gained the consolation prize of the Plate, defeating reigning series champions South Africa in the final. The Bowl was won by England and the Shield by Japan.

Format
The teams were drawn into four pools of four teams each. Each team played the other teams in their pool once, with 3 points awarded for a win, 2 points for a draw, and 1 point for a loss (no points awarded for a forfeit). The top two teams from each group progressed to quarter-finals in the main competition, with the winners of those quarter-finals competing in cup semi-finals and the losers competing in plate semi-finals. The bottom two teams from each group progressed to quarter-finals in the consolation competition, with the winners of those quarter-finals competing in bowl semi-finals and the losers competing in shield semi-finals.

Teams
The participating teams were:

Pool stage

The tournament started on the Friday night and Saturday with matches between teams in the same pool on a round robin basis. The following is a list of the recorded results.

Pool A
{| class="wikitable" style="text-align: center;"
|-
!width="200"|Team
!width="40"|Pld
!width="40"|W
!width="40"|D
!width="40"|L
!width="40"|PF
!width="40"|PA
!width="40"|+/-
!width="40"|Pts
|- 
|align=left| 
|3||3||0||0||104||7||+97||9
|- 
|align=left| 
|3||2||0||1||40||71||-31||7
|- 
|align=left| 
|3||1||0||2||39||52||-10||5
|- 
|align=left| 
|3||0||0||3||14||67||-53||3
|}

Pool B
{| class="wikitable" style="text-align: center;"
|-
!width="200"|Team
!width="40"|Pld
!width="40"|W
!width="40"|D
!width="40"|L
!width="40"|PF
!width="40"|PA
!width="40"|+/-
!width="40"|Pts
|- 
|align=left| 
|3||2||1||0||90||12||+78||8
|- 
|align=left| 
|3||2||1||0||99||29||+70||8
|- 
|align=left| 
|3||1||0||2||26||109||-83||5
|- 
|align=left| 
|3||0||0||3||27||92||-65||3
|}

Pool C
{| class="wikitable" style="text-align: center;"
|-
!width="200"|Team
!width="40"|Pld
!width="40"|W
!width="40"|D
!width="40"|L
!width="40"|PF
!width="40"|PA
!width="40"|+/-
!width="40"|Pts
|- 
|align=left| 
|3||2||0||1||89||36||+50||7
|- 
|align=left| 
|3||2||0||1||74||24||+50||7
|- 
|align=left| 
|3||2||0||1||53||33||+20||7
|- 
|align=left| 
|3||0||0||3||12||132||-120||3
|}

Pool D
{| class="wikitable" style="text-align: center;"
|-
!width="200"|Team
!width="40"|Pld
!width="40"|W
!width="40"|D
!width="40"|L
!width="40"|PF
!width="40"|PA
!width="40"|+/-
!width="40"|Pts
|- 
|align=left| 
|3||3||0||0||93||17||+76||9
|- 
|align=left| 
|3||2||0||1||53||64||–11||7
|- 
|align=left| 
|3||1||0||2||71||41||+30||5
|- 
|align=left| 
|3||0||0||3||12||107||–95||3
|}

Knockout

Play on the last day of the tournament consisted of finals matches for the Bowl, Plate, and Cup competitions. The following is a list of the recorded results.

Shield

Bowl

Plate

Cup

Statistics

Individual points

Individual tries

Reference list

External links
Adelaide Sevens

Adelaide
Australian Sevens
2010 in Australian rugby union